Woody Gwyn (born 1944, San Antonio, Texas) is an American artist.
He studied at the Pennsylvania Academy of Fine Arts.
His work is in the New Mexico Museum of Art, Albuquerque Museum, Eiteljorg Museum, and Phoenix Art Museum.  He was a 2010 recipient of the New Mexico Governor's Awards for Excellence in the Arts.

He has a studio in Galisteo, New Mexico.

Exhibitions
 Luther W. Brady Art Gallery, George Washington University, 2010.

References

Sources
Woody Gwyn, Texas Tech University Press, January 15, 1994,

External links
Woody Gwyn

1944 births
Living people
20th-century American painters
American male painters
21st-century American painters
Artists from New Mexico
20th-century American printmakers
20th-century American male artists